Tatiri is a town and a nagar panchayat in Baghpat district in the Indian state of Uttar Pradesh.
The distance between Aggarwal Mandi Tatiri and Baghpat is 5 km. Tatiri is connected to two districts : Baghpat and Meerut, by road, via (NH-334B).Towards 5 km west SH-57 road which connects New Delhi- Baghpat - Baraut -Shamli - Saharanpur.

Demographics
 India census, Agarwal Mandi had a population of 12,398. Males constitute 53% of the population and females 47%. Aggarwal Mandi has an average literacy rate of 90%, higher than the national average of 59.5%; with 60% of the males and 40% of females literate. 15% of the population is under 6 years of age.

Transport
It is well connected with Delhi - Saharanpur -Haridwar through railway network which is also used by its nearby villages. It also touch the National Highway (NH-334B) connects some major cities Sonipat - Baghpat - Tatiri - Meerut - Garh . In 5 km North SH-57 is located between Delhi to Saharanpur via Baghpat & 40 km East NH-58 which also connects Delhi Saharanpur &Haridwar via Ghaziabad, Meerut, Muzzafarnagar, Roorkee.
Railway and Buses are main transport for this Town.

Medical facilities
A Government hospital is functioning since 1970. The Government Medical Center is relatively outdated, thought the present UP state government have plans to modernize the currently available facilities. Local Jain community is also running a hospital. There are also many clinics by renowned doctors in the town. A private hospital is also running named as SARVODAYA HOSPITAL having MBBS Doctor staff.

References
Official Website - //www.tatiri.co.in/

Cities and towns in Bagpat district